Aer is an album by Swiss pianist and composer Nik Bärtsch's band Mobile recorded in Zürich in 2003 and first released on the Tonus Music label in 2004.

Reception
On All About Jazz Budd Kopman noted "Mobile as a group has a slightly different focus than Ronin. The music has more of the "ritual" in it and less of the "groove." While repetition comes more to center stage, development is not forgotten, and static feeling that grows over time is balanced by addition, subtraction or mutation".

Track listing
All compositions by Nik Bärtsch
 "Modul 29" – 8:01  
 "Modul 16" – 11:02  
 "Modul 18" – 4:48  
 "Modul 20" – 3:07  
 "Modul 26" – 2:06  
 "Modul 8_11" – 10:42

Personnel
 Nik Bärtsch – piano
 Sha – bass clarinet, alto saxophone
 Mats Eser – marimba, percussion
 Kaspar Rast – drums

References

Nik Bärtsch albums
2004 albums